Yaba is a department or commune of Nayala Province in western Burkina Faso. Its capital is the town of Yaba. According to the 2019 census the department has a total population of 41,369.

Towns and villages
	(6 591 inhabitants) (capital)
 Bagnontenga	(1 105 inhabitants)
 Basnéré	(182 inhabitants)
 Biba	(3 479 inhabitants)
 Bo	(1 116 inhabitants)
 Bounou	(3 145 inhabitants)
 Doloba	(167 inhabitants)
 Issapougo	(924 inhabitants)
 Kera	(845 inhabitants)
 Lah	(378 inhabitants)
 Largogo	(96 inhabitants)
 Loguin	(305 inhabitants)
 Pangogo	(1 187 inhabitants)
 Pasnam	(432 inhabitants)
 Sapala	(1 165 inhabitants)
 Saran	(1 095 inhabitants)
 Siellé	(3 064 inhabitants)
 Siena	(1 191 inhabitants)
 Tiema	(444 inhabitants)
 Toba	(1 227 inhabitants)
 Tosson	(1 068 inhabitants)
 Zaré	(600 inhabitants)

References

Departments of Burkina Faso
Nayala Province